Events from the year 1965 in Scotland.

Incumbents 

 Secretary of State for Scotland and Keeper of the Great Seal – Willie Ross

Law officers 
 Lord Advocate – Gordon Stott
 Solicitor General for Scotland – Henry Wilson

Judiciary 
 Lord President of the Court of Session and Lord Justice General – Lord Clyde
 Lord Justice Clerk – Lord Grant
 Chairman of the Scottish Land Court – Lord Gibson until 12 April; then Lord Birsay

Events 
 March – Cables Wynd House ("Banana Flats") completed in Leith.
 24 March – Roxburgh, Selkirk and Peebles by-election: David Steel (Liberal) gains the seat from the Conservatives.
 12 April – Harald Leslie becomes Chairman of the Scottish Land Court, with the judicial title Lord Birsay. He replaces Lord Gibson.
 15 June – Law Commissions Act 1965, establishing the Scottish Law Commission, receives the Royal assent.
 August – Union Canal officially closed to navigation.
 5 August – the Registration of Births, Deaths and Marriages (Scotland) Act 1965 receives royal assent.
 11 August – first edition of The Celtic View, the official weekly magazine of Celtic F.C. in Glasgow, is published.
 20 August – Cassius Clay fights an exhibition bout at the Ice Rink, Paisley.
 6 September – Edinburgh Princes Street railway station is officially closed.
 15 October – the Cruachan Dam pumped-storage hydroelectricity scheme at Ben Cruachan near Oban opens.
 8 November – the Murder (Abolition of Death Penalty) Act suspends capital punishment for murder in England, Scotland and Wales, for five years in the first instance, replacing it with a mandatory sentence of life imprisonment.
 November – Harthill Bypass opened, first section of the M8 motorway and the first substantive section of motorway in Scotland.
 The Unionist Party in Scotland is renamed the Scottish Conservative and Unionist Party and constitutionally comes under the control of the London-based Conservative Party.
 Construction of the town of Dalgety Bay begins.
 Highlands and Islands Development Board formed.
 Corpach pulp and paper mills open.

Births 
 18 January – Paul Flexney, footballer
 20 January – Colin Calderwood, international footballer and coach
 22 January – Brian McCardie, actor
 27 January – Alan Cumming, actor
 6 February – Simone Lahbib, actress
 11 February – Keith Cochrane, businessman
 14 February – Ian Spittal, footballer
 16 February – Ally Maxwell, footballer and coach
 22 February – John Leslie (born John Leslie Stott), television presenter
 5 March – Carolyn Leckie, Scottish Socialist Party MSP (2003–2007)
 8 March – Paul Martin, footballer and manager
 20 March – William Dalrymple, historian
 22 March – Rob Wainwright, international rugby union footballer
 23 March – Marti Pellow (born Mark McLachlan), singer
 26 March – Pat McFadden, Labour MP (Wolverhampton 2005– )
 6 April – Andy Walker, footballer and TV pundit
 11 April – Lynn Ferguson, writer, actress, comedian and presenter
 25 April – Ally Dick, footballer
 16 May – Stuart Millar, football player and manager
 17 May – Keith Wright, international footballer
 24 May – Brian Irvine, international footballer
 28 May – Vic Kasule, footballer
 5 June – Allan Guthrie, literary agent, author and editor of crime fiction
 19 June – A. B. Jackson, poet
 22 June – Jimmy Sandison, footballer
 3 July – Tommy Flanagan, actor
 9 July – David O'Hara, actor
 12 July – Eric Cullen, actor (died 1996)
 15 July – Alistair Carmichael, Liberal Democrat politician and Secretary of State for Scotland
 19 July – Evelyn Glennie, virtuosa percussionist
 24 July – Julie Graham, actress
 26 July – Hamish Clark, actor
 11 August – Robert Fleck, international footballer and manager
 30 August – Peter Grant, international footballer and manager
 5 September – Murdo Fraser, Conservative MSP (2001– )
 11 September:
 Robert Docherty, footballer
 Graeme Obree, racing cyclist
 14 September – Paul McFadden, footballer
 27 September – Rhona Cameron, comedian
 14 October – Sandy Stewart, footballer and manager
 20 October – Norman Blake, singer, instrumentalist and songwriter
 22 October – A. L. Kennedy, fiction writer
 29 October – Paul Stewart, racing driver
 12 November – Eddie Mair, radio and television presenter
 19 November – Douglas Henshall, actor
 24 November – Shirley Henderson, actress
 25 November – Dougray Scott, actor
 28 November – Caroline Paterson, actress
 11 December – Alison Watt, painter
 13 December – Hugh Burns, footballer
 20 December – Robert Cavanah, actor, writer, director and producer
 21 December – Stuart Mitchell, pianist and composer
 31 December – Mike Conroy, footballer
Unknown
 Anne Bevan, visual artist, sculptor, and lecturer
 Christine Borland, sculptor
 Patricia Littlechild, sport shooter and neurosurgeon

Deaths 
 7 January – Anne Redpath, domestic painter (born 1895)
 1 February – Robert Spence, Labour MP
 14 February – David Ferguson Hunter, recipient of the Victoria Cross (born 1891)
 30 April – James William Slessor Marr, marine biologist and polar explorer (born 1902)
 17 March – Walter Potter Ritchie, recipient of the Victoria Cross (born 1892)
 31 March – Gerard Crole, international rugby union and cricket player (born 1894)
 9 April – Robert Gibson, Lord Gibson, lawyer and Labour MP
 9 May – Hugh O'Donnell, footballer (born 1913)
 16 July – William Reid, Scottish Labour Party Member of Parliament from 1950 to 1964 (born 1889)
 2 August – John Carmont, High Court Judge (born 1890)
 12 August – Willie Gallacher, trade unionist, activist and communist MP (born 1881)
 5 September – Tom Johnston, Labour MP, government minister and chairman of North of Scotland Hydro-Electric Board (born 1881)
 8 October – James Nelson, international footballer (born 1901)
 20 October – William Thomas Shaw, Unionist Party MP (born 1879)

The arts
 George Mackay Brown's poetry The Year of the Whale is published.
 The Royal Glasgow Institute of the Fine Arts opens the Kelly Gallery.
 31 December – "Pirate" radio station Radio Scotland begins broadcasting from LV Comet anchored outside U.K. territorial waters off Dunbar.

See also 
 1965 in Northern Ireland

References 

 
Scotland
Years of the 20th century in Scotland
1960s in Scotland